Universidad ORT Uruguay is Uruguay's largest private university. It has more than 13,000 students, distributed among five faculties and institutes.

History

ORT Uruguay was established in 1942 and is a member of the international World ORT educational network founded in 1880 by the Jewish community of St. Petersburg and with a presence in more than 60 countries.

In 1995, the Uruguayan government enacted decree 308/95 of 11 August establishing the country's first legal framework for the operation of private universities.

In February 1996, ORT Uruguay was the first institution to apply for authorisation to operate as a private university, granted in September of the same year.

In July 2012, the Institute of Education of Universidad ORT Uruguay launched Uruguay's first Doctorate in Education.

This advanced postgraduate course, recognised by the Uruguayan Ministry of Education and Culture in 2014, encompasses an international network of researchers who focus their academic efforts on issues of relevance to national educators.

ORT awards 75 professional qualifications at postgraduate, undergraduate and technical diploma levels in Architecture, Engineering, Biotechnology, Management, Economics, International Relations, Design, Animation, Communication and Education.

It has established academic cooperation agreements with more than 200 international universities and institutions worldwide to facilitate student exchanges and collaborative research and teaching projects. It is also a member of several international academic associations, including the International Association of Universities (IAU) and the Union of Latin American Universities (UDUAL).

The academic staff is made up of more than 1,500 lecturers and researchers, of whom more than a third are tenured at the university, allowing them to carry out research and work closely with their students.

The university runs a scholarship programme benefitting more than 1,000 new scholarship holders per year. The scholarships are aimed at new students whose income or family income prevents them from funding their studies in full, and at high-achieving school leavers.

The university's Centre for Innovation and Entrepreneurship (CIE), which was created in 2009, is aimed at fostering innovation and entrepreneurship, promoting opportunities and strengthening ties between business leaders and the academic and socio-productive sectors. The Centre for Innovation also has a laboratory where all the university's areas of knowledge and development converge.

The university is also represented by several sports teams: basketball, five-a-side football, handball, hockey and volleyball, all competing in Uruguay's university sports leagues.

In 2005, the degrees in Electronic Engineering and Telecommunications Engineering were certified at Mercosur level through the Experimental Mechanism for the Accreditation of Degrees (MEXA), for the maximum six-year period.

This accreditation was renewed in 2011, through the ARCU-SUR system that replaced MEXA.

The Architecture programme was also recognised by the ARCU-SUR system in 2009 for the maximum term, having renewed its certification in 2016.

In 2019 ORT was admitted to the United Nations Academic Impact (UNAI) network, a cluster of institutions promoting the UN's academic activities.

For its part, the Master's in Business Administration (MBA) was accredited by the Association of MBAs (AMBA) and is the only Uruguayan MBA to be included in the  published in June 2020.

The network, with 1,300 members in 135 countries, advocates for the protection of human rights, access to education, sustainability and conflict resolution.

Since July 2020, the university has been listed in the Times Higher Education Latin America University Rankings.

In September 2021, a study carried out by the world leader organisation in higher education analysis services QS Quacquarelli Symonds, placed Universidad ORT Uruguay among the 550 universities with the best employment rate for their graduates globally.

ORT's Graduate School of Business' Master of Business Administration – MBA, has been ranked between the 131 and 140 positions by the QS ranking for Executive MBAs 2021. In addition, is ranked in 7th place in Latin America. ORT's MBA is the only one in the country to be mentioned in this classification. 

For the third consecutive year (in 2022), the British publication Times Higher Education (THE) has once again included Universidad ORT Uruguay as the only one in Uruguay to be part of this classification.

Faculties and Institutes 
Faculty of Business Administration and Social Sciences
Faculty of Architecture
Faculty of Communication and Design
Faculty of Engineering
Institute of Education

Undergraduate degrees

Faculty of Business Administration and Social Sciences 

 Chartered Accountant
 Bachelor's Economics
 Bachelor's International Studies
 Bachelor's Management and Administration
 Bachelor's Marketing and Sales Management
 Bachelor's Digital Business

Faculty of Architecture 

 Architecture
 Bachelor's Design

Faculty of Communication and Design 

 Bachelor's Communication, major in Audiovisual Studies
 Bachelor's Communication, major in Digital Contents
 Bachelor's Communication, major in Journalism
 Bachelor's Communication, major in Advertising and Marketing
 Bachelor's Corporate Communication
 Bachelor's Communication, major in Data Analytics and Innovation
 Bachelor's Design, Art and Technology
 Bachelor's Animation and Videogames
 Bachelor's Fashion Design
 Bachelor's Graphic Design
 Bachelor's Industrial Design
 Bachelor's Multimedia Design

Faculty of Engineering 

 Biotechnology Engineering
 Electronic Engineering
 Electrical Engineering
 Systems Engineering
 Telecommunications Engineering
 Bachelor's Biotechnology
 Bachelor's Systems
 Bachelor's Telecommunications

Postgraduate degrees

Faculty of Business Administration and Social Sciences 

 Master's in Business Administration
 EMBA, Executive MBA (Blended Learning)
 Master's in Financial Management
 Specialised Diploma in Finance
 Master' s in Accounting and Finance
 Specialised Diploma in Taxation
 Master's in Taxation and Accounting Standards - IFRS
 Specialised Diploma in Accounting
 Master's in Human Resources
 Specialised Diploma in Human Resources
 Specialised Diploma in Management and Marketing
 Specialised Diploma in Business Analytics

Faculty of Architecture 

 Specialised Diploma in Real Estate Management
 Specialised Diploma in Design, Calculation and Construction of Timber Structures

Faculty of Communication and Design 

 Master's in Communication and Marketing Management
 Specialised Diploma in Communications Management

Faculty of Engineering 

 Master's in Engineering (through Research)
 Master's in Big Data
 Specialised Diploma in Big Data Analytics
 Specialised Diploma in Artificial Intelligence

Institute of Education 

 PhD in Education
 Master's in Education
 Diploma in Education
 Diploma in Educational Planning and Management
 Master's in Teacher Training
 Diploma in Teacher Training
 Master's in Educational Management

References

External links 
Website of the Universidad ORT Uruguay
Universidad ORT Uruguay on Facebook
Universidad ORT Uruguay on Instagram
Universidad ORT Uruguay on Twitter
Universidad ORT Uruguay in YouTube
University yearbooks
World ORT

 
Universities in Uruguay
Education in Montevideo
Educational institutions established in 1942
1942 establishments in Uruguay